Laurence Eusden (bapt. 6 September 168827 September 1730) was an English poet who became Britain's youngest Poet Laureate in 1718.

Life 
Laurence Eusden was born in Spofforth in the West Riding of Yorkshire in 1688 (date unknown) to the Rev. Laurence Eusden, rector of Spofforth, Yorkshire.  Eusden was baptized on 6 September 1688.  He received his education at St Peter's School, York, and at Trinity College, Cambridge. He became a minor fellow of his college in 1711, and in the next year was admitted to a full fellowship.

Early on, Eusden had decided upon building a career through influence. For someone like him, well-educated, with a fellowship at Trinity, but without family money and without well-placed relations, there was no other way to advance in the world.  He began to write, with the intention of using his ability to attract notice to himself. And with Newcastle's marriage he succeeded, as he was made Poet Laureate in 1718 by the Lord Chamberlain, Thomas Pelham-Holles, 1st Duke of Newcastle, as a reward for a flattering poem on Pelham-Holles' marriage.

Eusden, who was thirty years old at the time of his appointment was also the youngest Poet Laureate.  Eusden secured this post due to the death of the previous Poet Laureate, Nicholas Rowe, and the recommendation of Joseph Addison. Upon his appointment, Eusden produced Birthday and New Year Odes for twelve years.

The last few years of his life were unhappy. He was ordained as a cleric in the 1720s,  and assumed the office of rector of Coningsby, Lincolnshire, but his elevation to Poet Laureate brought him derision from his social and literary peers.  Eusden died at Coningsby on 27 September 1730. He was buried at his church, St Michael and All Angels, in Coningsby.

Poetry and criticism 
Eusden's work is difficult to find.  However, his The Origin Of The Knights Of The Bath, dedicated to the young William Augustus, later Duke of Cumberland, is available online. Its first twelve lines are reproduced below as an instance of Eusden's laudatory style:

Though he produced many translations and gratulatory poems, Eusden's literary reputation is dominated by the satirical allusions of Alexander Pope's satire The Dunciad: e.g. "Know, Eusden thirsts no more for sack or praise; He sleeps among the dull of ancient days."

In addition to Pope's skewering of Eusden's abilities, Thomas Gray, author of "Elegy Written in a Country Churchyard", said that "Eusden set out well in life, but afterward turned out a drunkard and besotted his faculties".

Notes

References 
Otago U
Laurence Eusden archive of Lincolnshire-web

External links 
 
 THE ORIGIN OF THE KNIGHTS OF THE BATH

1688 births
1730 deaths
18th-century English poets
British Poets Laureate
People educated at St Peter's School, York
People from Spofforth, North Yorkshire
18th-century English writers
18th-century English male writers
English male poets